The 2013–14 BYU Cougars women's basketball team represented Brigham Young University during the 2013–14 college basketball season. It was head coach Jeff Judkins thirteenth season at BYU. The Cougars, members of the West Coast Conference, played their home games at the Marriott Center. The Cougars placed second in both the regular season and the conference tournament. They qualified for the NCAA Tournament where they became the only team to lead UConn in the second half of a game during the season before their Sweet Sixteen departure.

Before the season

Departures

Recruiting
As early recruiting began, BYU had 3 players commit to play.

2013–14 media

BYU Radio Sports Network Affiliates

All Lady Cougar games that didn't conflict with men's basketball or football games were featured live on BYU Radio found nationwide on Dish Network 980, on Sirius XM 143, and online at www.byuradio.org.

Roster

Schedule
The conference schedule increased from 16 to 18 games with the addition of Pacific. The new schedule featured a travel format scenario where you will play on the road or at home for 2 consecutive games, typically on Thursday and Saturday with the following travel partners: BYU and San Diego, Pacific and Saint Mary's, Santa Clara and San Francisco, Loyola Marymount and Pepperdine, and Gonzaga and Portland.

|-
!colspan=8 style="background:#002654; color:#FFFFFF;"|Exhibition

|-
!colspan=8 style="background:#002654; color:#FFFFFF;"| Regular Season

|-
!colspan=8 style="background:#002654;"| 2014 WCC Tournament

|-
!colspan=8 style="background:#002654;"| 2014 NCAA Tournament

Game Summaries

Exhibition: Colorado Mesa

Exhibition: Westminster College

South Dakota State
Series History: First Meeting
Broadcasters: Spencer Linton, Kristen Kozlowski & Skyler Hardman

UNLV
Series History: BYU leads series 27-12
Broadcasters: Adam Candee, Dominique Harris & Jesse Vineyard

Boston College
Series History: Boston College leads series 1-0

Cal State Northridge
Series History: BYU leads 3-0
Broadcasters: Ryan Stanbury and Rheina Ale

Washington State
Series History: Series even 4-4
Broadcasters: Spencer Linton, Kristen Kozlowski & Skyler Hardman

Arizona
Series History: BYU leads 6-4
Broadcasters: Ty Brandenburg and Kristen Kozlowski

Nevada
Series History: BYU leads 6-1
Broadcaster: Don Marchand

Creighton
Series History: Series tied 6-6
Broadcasters: Brad Burwell and Rob Simms

Weber State
Series History: BYU leads 40-9
Broadcasters: Tyson Ewing and Brandon Garside

Utah
Series History: Utah leads series 61-40
Broadcasters: Dave McCann, Kristen Kozlowski & Spencer Linton

Utah State
Series History: BYU leads 31-3
Broadcasters: Spencer Linton, Kristen Kozlowski & Jake Edmonds

Loyola Marymount
Series History: BYU leads series 6-1
Broadcasters: Spencer Linton and Kristen Kozlowski

Pepperdine
Series History: BYU leads 5-2
Broadcasters: Spencer Linton, Kristen Kozlowski & Andy Boyce

Pacific
Series History: BYU leads series 5-1
Broadcasters: Spencer Linton, Jarom Jordan & Andy Boyce

Saint Mary's
Series History: Saint Mary's leads 3-2
Broadcasters: Spencer Linton, Kristen Kozlowski & Andy Boyce

Gonzaga
Series History: Gonzaga leads series 7-5
Broadcasters: Greg Heister and Stephanie Hawk Freeman

Portland
Series History: BYU leads series 12-4
Broadcaster: Cody Barton

San Diego
Series History: BYU leads 6-0
Broadcasters: Justin Alderson and Tracy Warren

San Francisco
Series History: BYU leads series 8-2
Broadcasters: Spencer Linton, Kristen Kozlowski & Andy Boyce

Santa Clara
Series History: BYU leads 6-1
Broadcasters: Spencer Linton, Kristen Kozlowski & Andy Boyce

Saint Mary's
Series History: Series even 3-3
Broadcasters: George Devine and Mary Hile-Nepfel

Pacific
Series History: BYU leads 5-2
Broadcaster: Don Gubbins

Santa Clara
Series History: BYU leads series 7-1
Broadcaster: Doug Greenwald

San Francisco
Series History: BYU leads 9-2
Broadcaster: Joe Castellano

Portland
Series History: BYU leads series 13-4
Broadcasters: Spencer Linton, Kristen Kozlowski & Jake Edmonds

Gonzaga
Series History: Gonzaga leads series 8-5
Broadcasters: Spencer Linton, Kristen Kozlowski & Andy Boyce

Pepperdine
Series History: BYU leads 6-2
Broadcaster: Josh Perigo

Loyola Marymount
Series History: BYU leads series 7-1
Broadcaster: Trace Lee

San Diego
Series History: BYU leads 6-1
Broadcasters: Spencer Linton and Kristen Kozlowski

Pepperdine
Series History: BYU leads 7-2
Broadcasters: Spencer Linton and Kristen Kozlowski

Pacific
Series History: BYU leads 6-2
Broadcasters: Dave McCann and Blaine Fowler

Gonzaga
Series History: Gonzaga leads 8-6
Broadcasters: Dave Flemming and Sean Farnham

NC State
Series History: Series even 1-1
Broadcasters: Dave Pasch and Doris Burke

Nebraska
Series History: Nebraska leads 4-3
Broadcasters: Dave Pasch and Doris Burke

Connecticut
Series History: Connecticut leads 2-0
Broadcasters: Pam Ward, Carolyn Peck & LaChina Robinson

Rankings
2013–14 NCAA Division I women's basketball rankings

See also
BYU Cougars women's basketball

References

BYU Cougars women's basketball seasons
BYU
BYU
BYU Cougars
BYU Cougars